The R339 road is a regional road in Ireland which links the R358 regional road with Galway in County Galway.

The road passes through a number of villages including Castleblakeney, Melough and Monivea

See also 

 Roads in Ireland
 National primary road
 National secondary road

References 

Regional roads in the Republic of Ireland

Roads in County Galway